Roberto Gargini  (born 30 April 1962 in Trelew) is a former Argentine professional football (soccer) player.

Club career
Gargini played for Ferro Carril Oeste and Chaco For Ever in the Primera División de Argentina. He had also had a spell with Giannina in the Greek Super League during the 1990-91 season.

References

External links
 Profile on official website

1962 births
Living people
People from Trelew
Argentine people of Italian descent
Argentine footballers
Unión de Santa Fe footballers
Ferro Carril Oeste footballers
PAS Giannina F.C. players
Association football forwards